Treaty of Rome most commonly refers to the 1957 international agreement that led to the founding of the European Economic Community.

Treaty of Rome may also refer to:

 Treaty of Rome (1924), between the Kingdom of Italy and the Kingdom of Yugoslavia, created the Free State of Fiume
 Treaties of Rome (1941), established the borders between the Kingdom of Italy, the Independent State of Croatia, and the Governorate of Dalmatia
 Euratom Treaty (1957), established the European Atomic Energy Community
 Rome Statute of the International Criminal Court (2002), established the ICC
 The Second Treaty of Rome (2004), also known as the Treaty establishing a Constitution for Europe

See also 
 Rome Convention (disambiguation)